John Carnegie ( – by May 1750) of Boysack, Angus was a Scottish lawyer and politician who sat in the House of Commons from 1708 to 1716 when he was expelled for supporting the Jacobite rebellion.

Carnegie was the eldest son of John Carnegie of Boysack and his wife Jean Fotheringham, daughter of David Fotheringham of Powrie, Forfar, Shire Commissioner in the Parliament of Scotland. He had succeeded to the estate of his father by 1683. He was educated at Marischal College from 1696 to 1698 and at the University of Leyden in 1700, aged 20. In 1703, he was admitted as an advocate. He married Margaret Skene, daughter of James Skene of Grange and Kirkcaldy, Fife on 6 November 1707.

At the 1708 general election Carnegie was returned as the Member of Parliament (MP) for Forfar, the county's first representative to the House of Commons of Great Britain. He was returned again for Forfar at the 1710 general election and in 1713. In 1714 he was appointed Solicitor General for Scotland but was only in post for 6 months. At the 1715 general election, he was returned as MP for Forfar. He took part in the Jacobite rising of 1715, for which he was expelled from the House of Commons in 1716.

Carnegie died by 14 May 1750. He had two sons, and his elder son was served as heir.

References 

Year of birth uncertain
1680 births
1750 deaths
People from Angus, Scotland
Solicitors General for Scotland
Members of the Parliament of Great Britain for Scottish constituencies
British MPs 1708–1710
British MPs 1710–1713
British MPs 1713–1715
British MPs 1715–1722
People of the Jacobite rising of 1715
Members of the Faculty of Advocates
Expelled members of the Parliament of Great Britain